Murad may refer to:

 Murad
 Murad cigarettes
 Murad (actor)
 Murad (film)
 Murad, Iran, village in Iran
 Murad, Yemen or Hisn Murad, or Murad, small coastal fishing village 
 Murad (tribe), a Yemeni tribe

See also

 Mourad
 Murat (disambiguation)